Scotty Lake is the name of three lakes in the U.S. state of Alaska: